The Dovekeepers is a two-part television adaptation based on the book of the same name by Alice Hoffman from executive producers Roma Downey and Mark Burnett. It features the Siege of Masada by troops of the Roman Empire towards the end of the First Jewish–Roman War. The program premiered in the United States on March 31, 2015 on CBS.

Plot
According to the official trailer, 

Tagline: The trailer featured the tagline, "Their journey. Their passion. It all leads up to this. Take a stand."

Main cast
Cote de Pablo as Shirah
Rachel Brosnahan as Yael
Kathryn Prescott as Aziza
Diego Boneta as Amram
Sam Neill as Flavius Josephus 
Mido Hamada as Eleazar ben Ya'ir
Sam Hazeldine as Flavius Silva
Jonas Armstrong as Yoav
Luke Roberts as Jachim Ben Simon
Fiona O'Shaughnessy as Channa
Andrei Claude as Sa' Adollos
Kenneth Spiteri as Claudius  
Diarmaid Murtagh as Wynn
Manuel Cauchi as Josef Bar Elhanan
Andre Agius as Adir
Marama Corlett as Sia

Episodes

Reception
The adaptation garnered negative reviews: Keith Uhlich of The Hollywood Reporter writes "True to its title, this romantic-historical miniseries is more fowl than fair. CBS' two-part adaptation of Alice Hoffman's best-selling novel is a cheap, chintzy adventure." while Brian Lowry of Variety writes "Designed to play as a moving adaptation of Alice Hoffman's bestseller, The Dovekeepers is more of a wounded duck."

See also
 Masada, a 1981 television dramatization of the events at Masada

References

External links
 
 

American television films
2015 American television series debuts
English-language television shows
Television series based on actual events
Television series by CBS Studios
Television series by MGM Television
Television series created by Roma Downey
2015 American television series endings